Anorak is the second album by the band Ruth. They completed recording this album in May 2008 and is their most successful album to date. It was released on October 28, 2008 through Tooth & Nail Records. The lead single "Back to the Five" has become a minor hit in Christian radio. There is a music video for the song as well. The video placed on the X 2009 DVD Christian rock hits compilation.

Track listing
"Hibernation Pieces"
"Back to the Five"
"Who I Was and Who I Am"
"Rolling With the Punches"
"Hearts on Sleeves"
"Pure Concept"
"Forgetting to Remember"
"Nothing to Hide"
"Miracle Photo"
"Speechless Mess"
"Dead Giveaway"

References

2008 albums
Ruth (band) albums
Tooth & Nail Records albums
Albums produced by Aaron Sprinkle